The Layton Building is a historic commercial building at 1110 Mill Street in downtown Yellville, Arkansas.  Built in 1906, this rusticated stone two-story building is one of the largest in Marion County.  It has five irregularly-sized bays on the first floor and six on the second.  The entrances to the storefronts are set inward at a 45 degree angle.  There are decorative metal cornices between the floors and at the roof line.  The building's original commercial tenants were the Bank of Yellville and the Layton Department Store; the bank's vault is still in the building.

The building was listed on the National Register of Historic Places in 1978.

See also
National Register of Historic Places listings in Marion County, Arkansas

References

Commercial buildings on the National Register of Historic Places in Arkansas
Commercial buildings completed in 1906
National Register of Historic Places in Marion County, Arkansas
1906 establishments in Arkansas
Yellville, Arkansas